August Wilhelm Rehberg (13 January 1757 - 10 August 1836) was a German philosopher.

References

German philosophers
Kant scholars
Philosophy academics
1757 births
1836 deaths
University of Göttingen alumni